"Heartbeat" is a song by K-pop band 2PM. It was released on November 10, 2009, as the lead single for 01:59PM.

Promotion
Six teaser videos, each featuring one of the band members, were released in the weeks leading up to the album's release on YouTube. The videos started with various close-up shots of the band members hooked up to medical equipment and speaking. The videos then pan to a heartbeat monitor, play a short clip of the song, and displays the text "What is your Heartbeating for?" Taecyeon's video mentioned the inclusion of seven members in the band, although the seventh member (Jaebeom) exited the group before release of "Heartbeat."

Music video
The song's music video was released on November 11, 2009, the day after the song's release. It features dark, moody visuals. The color palette is mostly blacks, greys, and whites. It is the band's first music video to exclude Jaebeom, who left the band a few months before the video's release.

Accolades

References

2009 singles
2PM songs
JYP Entertainment singles
Korean-language songs
2009 songs
Songs written by Park Jin-young
Kakao M singles